Jost Fitschen (1 January 1869, in Brest (Lower Saxony) – 26 January 1947, in Hamburg-Altona) was a German botanist known for his work in the field of dendrology.

Beginning in 1889, he worked as a schoolteacher in the town of Geversdorf, afterwards teaching classes in Magdeburg (1894–1901), where he worked closely with Otto Schmeil. With Schmeil, he was co-author of the popular "Flora von Deutschland", a book on German flora that was published over many editions (90th edition issued in 1996). From 1901 to 1930, he taught classes in Altona, where for a period of time he also served as an academic rector. In his later years, he suffered from a nervous disorder that placed severe limitations on his activities.

Publications 
 Flora von Deutschland : ein Hilfsbuch zum Bestimmen der zwischen den deutschen Meeren und den Alpen wildwachsenden und angebauten Pflanzen (with Otto Schmeil) Leipzig : Quelle & Meyer,  edition 30, 1922 – Flora of Germany: An auxiliary book to determine wild and frequently cultivated plants in Germany.
 Handbuch der Nadelholzkunde: Systematik, Beschreibung, Verwendung u. Kultur d. Ginkgoaceen, Freiland-Koniferen u. Gnetaceen. Für Gärtner, Forstbeamte u. Botaniker. Mit Beitr. v. H. Klebahn u.a. Mit 204 Textabb (with Ludwig Beissner) 1930 – Handbook of softwoods : systematics, descriptions, usage in cultivation of Ginkgoaceae, free-range conifers and Gnetaceae. For gardeners, forestry officials and botanists. with contributions by Heinrich Klebahn, inter alia with 204 text abbreviations.
 Gehölzflora ein Buch zum Bestimmen der in Deutschland und den angrenzenden Ländern wildwachsenden und angepflanzten Bäume und Sträucher. 3., erw. Aufl 1935 – Woody plants; a book for the determination of wild and cultivated trees and shrubs in Germany and neighboring countries.

References 

1869 births
1947 deaths
19th-century German botanists
Dendrologists
People from Stade (district)
20th-century German botanists